Piccolo Park is a  public park in Portland, Oregon's Hosford-Abernethy neighborhood, in the United States. The space was acquired in 1989. In 2018, Portland Monthly Rebecca Jacobson wrote, "In an alternate reality, this land would be part of a freeway, an eight-lane artery splitting off the Marquam Bridge and lashing through Southeast on its way to Mount Hood. Those dastardly plans were torpedoed in 1974, and in 1989 (happy 30th, Piccolo!) this midblock half-acre park opened off of SE Division between 27th and 28th Avenues. The little oasis has a playground and enough grass to turn 14 successive cartwheels."

References

1989 establishments in Oregon
Hosford-Abernethy, Portland, Oregon
Parks in Portland, Oregon